Botond Storcz (born 30 January 1975) is a retired Hungarian sprint canoeist. He competed at the 2000 and 2004 Olympics and won three gold medals (K-2 500 m: 2000, K-4 1000 m: 2000, 2004). He also won eleven medals at the ICF Canoe Sprint World Championships with four golds (K-1 500 m: 1997, K-1 1000 m: 1997, K-4 500 m: 1997, K-4 1000 m: 1999), five silvers (K-2 500 m: 1999, K-4 500 m: 1998, K-4 1000 m: 1997, 1998, 2001), and two bronzes (K-2 500 m: 2002, K-4 500 m: 1999).

Storcz was named Hungarian Sportsman of the Year in 1997 for winning three gold medals at that year's World Championships. He worked as a canoeing coach at the Hungarian University of Physical Education. Since 2009 he is the head coach of the Hungarian National Kayak Canoe Team.

Awards
 Hungarian kayaker of the Year (2): 1997, 2000
 Hungarian Sportman of the Year (1) - votes of sports journalists: 1997
 Hungarian President of the Year (2) - votes of sports journalists: 2011, 2014

Orders and special awards
  Order of Merit of the Republic of Hungary – Officer's Cross (2000)
   Order of Merit of the Republic of Hungary – Commander's Cross (2004)
   Order of Merit of Hungary – Commander's Cross with Star (2012)

References
Kataca.hu profile

External links
 
 

1975 births
Budapest Honvéd FC canoers
Canoeists at the 2000 Summer Olympics
Canoeists at the 2004 Summer Olympics
Hungarian male canoeists
Hungarian educators
Living people
Olympic canoeists of Hungary
Olympic gold medalists for Hungary
Canoeists from Budapest
Olympic medalists in canoeing
ICF Canoe Sprint World Championships medalists in kayak
Medalists at the 2004 Summer Olympics
Medalists at the 2000 Summer Olympics
20th-century Hungarian people
21st-century Hungarian people